Saccharum is a genus of tall perennial plants of the broomsedge tribe within the grass family.

The genus is widespread across tropical, subtropical, and warm temperate regions in Africa, Eurasia, Australia, the Americas, and assorted oceanic islands. Several species are cultivated and naturalized in areas outside their native habitats.

Saccharum includes the sugarcanes. They have stout, jointed, fibrous stalks that are generally rich in sugar, and measure two to six m (6 to 19 ft) tall. All sugarcane species interbreed and the major commercial cultivars are complex hybrids.

Species
, Plants of the World Online accepted the following species:
 Saccharum alopecuroidum (L.) Nutt. - southeastern USA
 Saccharum angustifolium (Nees) Trin. - South America
 Saccharum asperum (Nees) Steud. - South America
 Saccharum baldwinii Spreng. - southeastern USA
 Saccharum beccarii (Stapf) Cope - Sumatra
 Saccharum brevibarbe (Michx.) Pers. - southeastern USA
 Saccharum coarctatum (Fern.) R. Webster - southeastern USA
 Saccharum contortum (Baldwin ex Elliott) Nutt. - southeastern USA
 Saccharum fallax Balansa - China, Assam, southeast Asia
 Saccharum filifolium Steud. - Afghanistan, Himalayas
 Saccharum formosanum (Stapf) Ohwi - southern China
 Saccharum giganteum (Walt.) Pers. - southeastern USA, Cuba, Jamaica, Paraguay, Argentina
 Saccharum griffithii Munro ex Aitch. - from Yemen to Bangladesh
 Saccharum intermedium Welker & Peichoto
 Saccharum kajkaiense (Melderis) Melderis - Oman, Iran, Afghanistan, Pakistan
 Saccharum longesetosum (Andersson) V.Naray. ex Bor - China, Himalayas, Indochina
 Saccharum maximum (Brongn.) Trin. - Pacific Islands
 Saccharum narenga (Nees ex Steud.) Hack. - China, Indian Subcontinent, Indochina, Ethiopia
 Saccharum officinarum L. - New Guinea; naturalized in many warm places
 Saccharum robustum Brandes & Jesw. ex Grassl - New Guinea
 Saccharum rufipilum Steud. - China, Indian Subcontinent, Indochina
 Saccharum sikkimense (Hook.f.) V.Naray. ex Bor - eastern Himalayas
 Saccharum × sinense Roxb. – China
 Saccharum spontaneum L. - Asia, Africa, Sicily, Papuasia
 Saccharum stewartii Rajesw., R.R.Rao & Arti Garg - western Himalayas
 Saccharum velutinum (Holttum) Cope - Peninsular Malaysia
 Saccharum villosum Steud. - South America, Mesoamerica
 Saccharum wardii (Bor) Bor ex Cope - Assam, Bhutan, Myanmar
 Saccharum williamsii (Bor) Bor ex Cope - Nepal

Placed in Lasiorhachis by Plants of the World Online :
 Saccharum hildebrandtii (Hack.) Clayton → Lasiorhachis hildebrandtii
 Saccharum perrieri (A.Camus) Clayton. → Lasiorhachis perrieri
 Saccharum viguieri (A.Camus) Clayton → Lasiorhachis viguieri

Placed in Tripidium by Plants of the World Online :
 Saccharum arundinaceum Retz. - East + South + Southeast Asia; New Guinea → Tripidium arundinaceum
 Saccharum bengalense Retz. - India, Pakistan, Iran, Afghanistan → Tripidium bengalense
 Saccharum kanashiroi (Ohwi) Ohwi - Ryukyu Islands → Tripidium kanashiroi
 Saccharum procerum Roxb. - China, Himalayas, Indochina → Tripidium procerum
 Saccharum ravennae (L.) L. - Europe, Asia, Africa → Tripidium ravennae
 Saccharum strictum (Host) Spreng. - from Italy to Iran → Tripidium strictum

Formerly included
Numerous species are now considered better suited in other genera: Andropogon, Chloris, Digitaria, Eriochrysis, Eulalia, Gynerium, Hemarthria, Imperata, Lophopogon, Melinis, Miscanthus, Panicum, Pappophorum, Paspalum, Perotis, Pogonatherum, Pseudopogonatherum, Spodiopogon, and Tricholaena.

See also
 Domesticated plants and animals of Austronesia

References

External links 

 
Poaceae genera
Andropogoneae